Geji (Gezawa) is a minor Chadic dialect cluster of Bauchi State, Nigeria. The three varieties are Buu, Gyaazi and Mәgang. The latter two are quite close.

Varieties

Blench (2020) lists:

Buu
Gyaazi, Mәgang

Zaranda, an exonym for Bu, endonym Bùù, is a Chadic language spoken in the South of Bauchi State, in Nigeria, belonging to the South-Bauchi West group of Chadic languages (Shimizu 1978). Although generally associated with Bolu, Pelu and Geji, Buu stands apart from these other lects with which there is no intercomprehension. Most of the Buu population has migrated from the original location of the 
Zaranda village (Zaranda Habe, longitude 9,57; latitude 10,28) to the present Zaranda (longitude 9,52; latitude 10,23) where they have abandoned their language for Hausa and Fulfulde. The few that have retained their language live in Zaranda Habe, in houses scattered in the hills, gathering around the chief once a year for the traditional religious festivities. It is believed to be clearly distinct and probably a separate language.

Gezawa, Gaejawa are exonyms for Geji, endonym Gyaazә. Bagba is a loconym.

Mәgang ('Mugan') is spoken by about 3,000-4,000 speakers in the following 8 villages of Bauchi LGA, Bauchi State (all located just to the south of Bauchi city).

Belu and Pelu are variant spellings of Byeru, also spelled Pyaalu (Pyààlù) or Fyalu.

Numerals
The Mәgang numerals are:

References

Chadic languages